ECHS may refer to:

Schools

Canada
Edmonton Christian High School, Edmonton, Alberta

United States
East Catholic High School, Manchester, Connecticut
East Central High School (disambiguation), Tulsa, Oklahoma
East Chambers High School, Winnie, Texas
East Coweta High School, Coweta County, Georgia
Eastern Christian High School, North Haledon, New Jersey
Effingham County High School, Effingham County, Georgia
El Camino High School (disambiguation)
El Capitan High School, Lakeside, California
El Cerrito High School, El Cerrito, California
Elkhart Central High School, Elkhart, Indiana
Elyria Catholic High School, Elyria, Ohio
Environmental Charter High School, Lawndale, California
Escondido Charter High School, Escondido, California
Essex Catholic High School, Newark and East Orange, New Jersey

Other uses
Early college high school, programs that allow students to obtain college credit while in high school
ECHS1 (Enoyl Coenzyme A hydratase), a human gene
Ex-servicemen Contributory Health Scheme (ECHS); see Military Hospital, Hisar
Extended cylinder-head-sector) block, a translation scheme for data storage